Sugan is an album by saxophonist Phil Woods with pianist Red Garland recorded in 1957 and originally released on the Status label, a subsidiary of Prestige Records.

Reception

In his review for Allmusic, Scott Yanow stated: "essentially a bebop jam session... This little-known date is quite enjoyable".

Track listing
All compositions by Phil Woods, except as indicated.
 "Au Privave" (Charlie Parker) - 6:56  
 "Steeplechase" (Parker) - 7:27  
 "Last Fling" - 6:33  
 "Sugan" - 9:25  
 "Green Pines" - 5:02  
 "Scrapple from the Apple" (Parker) - 7:38

Personnel
Phil Woods - alto saxophone 
Ray Copeland - trumpet
Red Garland - piano
Teddy Kotick - bass 
Nick Stabulas - drums

References

Prestige Records albums
Phil Woods albums
Red Garland albums
1957 albums
Albums recorded at Van Gelder Studio
Albums produced by Bob Weinstock